This article is the discography of American rock and roll musician Eddie Cochran.

Albums

Studio albums

Live albums

Compilation albums

EPs

Singles

Charting reissues

Notes

References 

Discographies of American artists
Rock music discographies